Zelentia pustulata is a species of sea slug, an aeolid nudibranch, a marine gastropod mollusc in the family Trinchesiidae.

Distribution
This species was described from Cullercoats, North Sea, England. It has been reported from the NE Atlantic from Orkney south to Lundy Island in the Bristol Channel. Also reported from the Atlantic coast of North America. This species has been reported from Maine,  the Barents Sea and the White Sea.

Ecology 
Zelentia pustulata feeds on the hydroid Halecium muricatum, family Haleciidae.

References 

Trinchesiidae
Gastropods described in 1854